, pen name , was a Japanese author. His daughter, Aya Kōda, was also a noted author who often wrote about him.

Kōda wrote "The Icon of Liberty", also known as "The Buddha of Art" or "The Elegant Buddha", in 1889. A house (Kagyu-an or "snail cottage") in which Kōda lived was rebuilt in 1972 by the Meiji Mura museum. Kōda was one of the first persons to be awarded the Order of Culture when it was established in 1937.

Early life
Rohan was born in the Kanda District of Tokyo.  He went to Hibiya High School and Aoyama Gakuin, but he did not graduate from both schools. He was the son of Koda Shigenobu (1839?--1914) and Koda Yu (1842?-1919), whose father was Koda Ritei, a samurai official serving under the local daimyō.  Rohan's childhood name was Tetsushiro ("shiro" implying the fourth son) Shigeyuki.

Notable short stories
"Dewdrops" (1889)
"Love Bodhisattva" (1889)
"Encounter with a Skull" (1890)
"A Sealed Letter" (1890)
"The Five-Storied Pagoda" (1891) (translated into English as The Pagoda)
"The Bearded Samurai"

Poems
Leaving the Hermitage (1905)

Novels
The Whaler (1891)
The Minute Storehouse of Life (unfinished)

In fiction
The 1960 Kon Ichikawa film Her Brother is adapted from an autobiographical work by Aya Koda.  Consequently, the character of "Father" (played by Masayuki Mori) is based on Kōda Rohan.
Kōda Rohan, along with many other historical figures from the Meiji Restoration, is a protagonist of the 1985 award-winning historical fantasy novel Teito Monogatari by Aramata Hiroshi.  In the first film adaptation of the novel, he was played by veteran actor Kōji Takahashi.  In the animated adaptation he was voiced by Yūsaku Yara.
In Part 4 of JoJo's Bizarre Adventure: Diamond is Unbreakable, by Hirohiko Araki, the character Kishibe Rohan has his name based on that of Kōda Rohan's pen name.

See also
Japanese literature
List of Japanese authors

References

Mulhern, Rohan Kishibe - Koda Rohan, Twayne Publishers, 1977
Rimer, J. Thomas - The Columbia Anthology Of Modern Japanese Literature, Columbia University Press 2005

External links
 The Pagoda, trans. Sakae Shioya (1909) [pdf online]

1867 births
1947 deaths
19th-century Japanese novelists
Recipients of the Order of Culture